James R. Stein is an American screenwriter and television producer. For his work on The Carol Burnett Show and the 1973 comedy special Lily, Stein has won two Primetime Emmy Awards.

Selected filmography

References

External links

American male screenwriters
Television producers from Illinois
Emmy Award winners
Writers from Chicago
1950 births
Living people
Screenwriters from Illinois